Gymnolaena is a genus of Mexican flowering plants in the family Asteraceae.

 Species
 Gymnolaena chiapasana Strother - Chiapas
 Gymnolaena oaxacana (Greenm.) Rydb. - 	Oaxaca, Puebla
 Gymnolaena serratifolia (DC.) Rydb. - 	Oaxaca

 formerly included
 Gymnolaena integrifolia (A.Gray) Rydb., Synonym of Comaclinium montanum (Benth.) Strother
 Gymnolaena seleri (B.L.Rob. & Greenm.) Rydb., Synonym of Boeberoides grandiflora (DC.) Strother

References

Tageteae
Endemic flora of Mexico
Asteraceae genera